Cryptozoo is a 2021 American adult animated drama film written and directed by Dash Shaw. It features an ensemble cast as Lake Bell, Michael Cera, Angeliki Papoulia, Zoe Kazan, Peter Stormare, Grace Zabriskie, Louisa Krause and Thomas Jay Ryan. The film had its world premiere at the Sundance Film Festival on January 29, 2021 and was released by Magnolia Pictures in the United States on August 20, 2021.

Plot
Cryptozookeepers try to capture a Baku, a dream-eating hybrid creature of legend, and start wondering if they should display these beasts or keep them hidden and unknown. Meanwhile, a pair of lovers mistakenly find their way into the Cryptozoo, leading to unpredictable consequences in 1960s San Francisco.

Cast
 Lake Bell as Lauren Grey, a veterinarian cryptozoologist who works at the Cryptozoo, and the main protagonist.
 Michael Cera as Matthew
 Angeliki Papoulia as Phoebe, a gorgon.
 Zoe Kazan as Magdalene
 Peter Stormare as Gustav, a faun.
 Grace Zabriskie as Joan, the owner of the Cryptozoo and Lauren Grey's mentor.
 Louisa Krause as Amber
 Thomas Jay Ryan as Nicholas, a cryptid-hating cryptid trafficker, and the main antagonist. 
 Alex Karpovsky as David

Release and reception
The film had its world premiere at the Sundance Film Festival on January 29, 2021  and won the Innovator Award.  Shortly after, Magnolia Pictures acquired U.S. distribution rights to the film and set it for an August 20, 2021 release in the United States. The film also screened at the 71st Berlin International Film Festival in March 2021.

Cryptozoo holds a 72% approval rating on review aggregator website Rotten Tomatoes, based on 89 reviews, with an average rating of 5.80/10. The site's critical consensus reads, "Although its visual overstimulation threatens to derail its themes, Cryptozoo is an ambitious and unique critique of capitalistic values." On Metacritic, the film holds a rating of 74 out of 100, based on 22 critics, indicating "generally favorable reviews".

Jessica Kiang of  Variety wrote: "In this zoo, the story may be tame, but the images, and the imagination that releases them, run wild."

It was also nominated for the John Cassavetes Award at the 37th Independent Spirit Awards.

References

External links
 Official Site
 
 Official trailer

2021 films
2021 independent films
American adult animated films
American drama films
American independent films
2020s American animated films
Sundance Film Festival award winners
2021 animated films
2021 drama films
Magic realism films
Films set in the 1960s
Films set in San Francisco
Collage film
Films directed by Dash Shaw
2020s English-language films